Gilbert Villegas (born in Chicago on October 26, 1970) is a Marine Veteran and served during the Gulf War. He's an American politician serving as a member of the Chicago City Council from the 36th ward. The 36th ward includes Belmont-Cragin, Galewood, Hermosa, Humboldt Park, Montclare and Portage Park.
 Prior to his election to the Chicago City Council, he served as chief of staff of the Illinois Capital Development Board.

Political career

Chicago City Council 
In 2015, Villegas was elected as the 36th ward alderman. He was reelected in 2019. He is a member of the following committees; Aviation, Committees, Rules and Ethics, Economic, Capital and Technology Development, Health and Environmental Protection, Pedestrian and Traffic Safety, and Transportation and Public Way. He is also a member of the Chicago City Council Latino Caucus.

In the runoff of the 2019 Chicago mayoral election, Villegas endorsed Lori Lightfoot. During her transition, Lightfoot named Villegas to be her floor leader in the City Council as well as the economic development committee chair.

2022 Congressional Election 

In November 2021, Villegas declared his candidacy for Illinois's 3rd congressional district in the 2022 election. During the election he was accused of “misleading the public” in campaign mailers touting the congressional candidate's support for a massive affordable housing development near the Blue Line. On June 28, 2022 he was defeated by Delia Ramirez (66% to 24%) for the Democratic primary for U.S. House Illinois 3rd Congressional District.

References

External links
Constituent Services website

1970 births
21st-century American politicians
Candidates in the 2022 United States House of Representatives elections
Chicago City Council members
Hispanic and Latino American politicians
Illinois Democrats
Living people
Northeastern Illinois University alumni